Myroconger seychellensis is an eel in the family Myrocongridae (thin eels) described by Emma Stanislavovna Karmovskaya in 2006. It is a marine, deep-water dwelling eel known from Seychelles in the Indian Ocean (from which its species epithet is derived). It is known to dwell at a maximum depth of 200 m. Females can reach a maximum total length of 45 cm.

References

Eels
Fish described in 2006